Regnosaurus (meaning "Sussex lizard") is a genus of herbivorous stegosaurian dinosaur that lived during the Early Cretaceous Period in what is now England. It was one of the first stegosaurs disvovered.

Discovery and species
 
The fossil remains, a portion of the right lower jaw, were found near Cuckfield in Sussex, and made part of the collection of the British Museum of Natural History. In 1839 Gideon Mantell reported having noticed the fossil during a visit. Mantell soon came to the conclusion that the specimen represented the, until then unknown, lower jaw of his Iguanodon, probably that of a juvenile. On 8 February 1841 he presented it as such to the Royal Society. This interpretation was immediately challenged by Richard Owen, who felt that any proof of a connection was lacking. In 1848, after several real jaws of Iguanodon had been discovered, Mantell changed his position, concluding it was a related but different genus or subgenus, coining the name Regnosaurus Northamptoni. The generic name is derived from the Regni, a British tribe inhabiting Sussex. The specific name honours Spencer Compton, 2nd Marquess of Northampton, the president of the Royal Society, who was about to resign. By present conventions, the type species is written as Regnosaurus northamptoni.

Regnosaurus is known only from the holotype BMNH 2422, a right mandibular (lower jaw) fragment, consisting of a third of the dentary and a part of the splenial,  found in the Tunbridge Wells Sand Formation.  The specimen is six inches long and shows fifteen tooth sockets. Also some replacement teeth are visible. Other bone fragments have sometimes been referred to Regnosaurus, such as a fossil pubis recovered on the Isle of Wight, but as these are of other parts of the body and a reasonably complete skeleton is lacking, the identity cannot be proven. The same is true for some dermal spikes reported by William Blows. Regnosaurus was probably a rather small animal, about 4 metres (13 feet) long.

Phylogeny
First seen as some iguanodontid, Regnosaurus was later connected to armoured dinosaurs. In 1888 Richard Lydekker assigned it to the Scelidosauridae. In 1909 Friedrich von Huene classified it in the stegosaurian Omosauridae and in 1911 Alfred von Zittel assigned it to the Stegosauridae but these groups then had a different content and also included armoured forms. In 1956 Alfred Romer synonymised it with Hylaeosaurus. An entirely different suggestion was made by John Ostrom who surmised it might have been a sauropod.

The first to state that it was a stegosaurian in the modern sense was George Olshevsky in 1993. This was confirmed by Paul Barrett and Paul Upchurch in 1995 who concluded that it is a stegosaur similar to Huayangosaurus, as the jaws are very similar. As the remains are so limited, many recent researchers have concluded Regnosaurus to be a nomen dubium.

See also 
 Timeline of stegosaur research

References 

Stegosaurs
Barremian life
Hauterivian life
Valanginian life
Early Cretaceous dinosaurs of Europe
Cretaceous England
Fossils of England
Fossil taxa described in 1848
Taxa named by Gideon Mantell
Nomina dubia
Ornithischian genera